The 2022 California elections took place on November 8, 2022. The statewide direct primary election was held on June 7, 2022.

California voters elected all of California's seats to the United States House of Representatives, one seat to the United States Senate, all of the seats of the California State Assembly, all even-numbered seats of the California State Senate, and the Governor of California and various statewide offices.

Pursuant to Proposition 14 passed in 2010, California uses a nonpartisan blanket primary for its races. All the candidates for the same elected office, regardless of respective political party, run against each other at once during the primary. The candidates receiving the most and second-most votes in the primary election then become the contestants in the general election.

United States Congress

Senate

Incumbent Democratic senator Alex Padilla was appointed to the seat in 2021 after his predecessor Kamala Harris resigned to become Vice President of the United States. He intended to run for election to a full term. Harris was first elected in 2016 with 61.6% of the vote.

There were two elections on the ballot for the same Class 3 seat: a special election for the remainder of Harris's term expiring on January 3, 2023, and a general election for the full term ending on January 3, 2029.

Special election

General election

House of Representatives

Due to results of the 2020 United States Census, California will have 52 seats in the United States House of Representatives up for election, a loss of one seat. This is the first time the state will lose a congressional delegation in its history.

Statewide constitutional offices

Governor

Incumbent Democratic governor Gavin Newsom ran for re-election. Newsom was first elected in 2018 with 61.9% of the vote. He faced a recall election in 2021 in which he prevailed.

Lieutenant Governor

Incumbent Democratic lieutenant governor Eleni Kounalakis ran for re-election. She was first elected in 2018 with 56.6% of the vote.

Attorney General

Incumbent Democratic Attorney General Rob Bonta was appointed in 2021 after his predecessor Xavier Becerra resigned to become U.S. Secretary of Health and Human Services. He intended to run for election to a full term. Becerra won election to a full term in 2018 with 63.6% of the vote.

Secretary of State

Incumbent Democratic Secretary of State Shirley Weber was appointed in 2021 after her predecessor Alex Padilla resigned to become a U.S. Senator. She intended to run for election to a full term. Padilla was re-elected in 2018 with 64.5% of the vote.

Treasurer

Incumbent Democratic Treasurer Fiona Ma ran for re-election. She was first elected in 2018 with 64.1% of the vote.

Controller

Incumbent Democratic Controller Betty Yee was term-limited and cannot run for re-election. She had been re-elected in 2018 with 65.5% of the vote.

Insurance Commissioner

Incumbent Democratic Insurance Commissioner Ricardo Lara ran for re-election. He was first elected in 2018 with 52.9% of the vote.

Superintendent of Public Instruction

Incumbent Democratic Superintendent Tony Thurmond ran for re-election. He was first elected in 2018 with 50.9% of the vote.

Board of Equalization

All four seats on the California State Board of Equalization were up for election, with all four incumbents eligible for re-election.

District 1
Incumbent Republican Ted Gaines ran for re-election. He was first elected in 2018 with 51.4% of the vote.

District 2
Incumbent Democrat Malia Cohen retired to run for state controller. She was first elected in 2018 with 72.8% of the vote.

District 3
Incumbent Democrat Tony Vazquez ran for re-election. He was first elected in 2018 with 69.9% of the vote.

District 4
Incumbent Democrat Mike Schaefer ran for re-election. He was first elected in 2018 with 52.2% of the vote.

State Legislature

State Senate

Californians elected all even-numbered seats to the California State Senate.

State Assembly

Californians elected all of the seats to the California State Assembly.

Propositions
In 2022, state propositions only appeared on the general election ballot. Pursuant to a November 2011 law, only propositions placed on the ballot by the state legislature may appear on the primary ballot, and the legislative body did not do so in 2022.

The following propositions qualified to appear on the general election ballot:

 Proposition 1
 Right to Reproductive Freedom Amendment. This is a constitutional amendment (Senate Constitutional Amendment 10) that was passed by the California Legislature in response to the U.S. Supreme Court ruling in Dobbs v. Jackson Women's Health Organization that held that the Constitution of the United States does not confer a right to abortion. The constitutional amendment established a right to reproductive freedom in the Constitution of California. It reads that the "state shall not deny or interfere with an individual's reproductive freedom in their most intimate decisions, which includes their fundamental right to choose to have an abortion and their fundamental right to choose or refuse contraceptives".

 Proposition 26
 Legalize Sports Betting on American Indian Lands Initiative. This combined constitutional amendment and state statute initiative placed on the ballot via petition would legalize sports betting at Native American casinos and licensed racetracks in California. It would also legalize roulette and dice games at Native American casinos, pending each tribal casino amending their tribal-state compacts. A 10 percent tax would also be levied on sports betting at racetracks, whose revenue would then be used for enforcement and problem-gambling programs.

 Proposition 27
 Legalize Sports Betting and Revenue for Homelessness Prevention Fund Initiative. This combined constitutional amendment and state statute initiative placed on the ballot via petition would legalize online and mobile sports betting platforms that are associated with an existing gaming tribe. Qualified online sports betting platforms would include those operated by a gaming tribe directly or a platform with an operating agreement with a gaming tribe. A 10 percent tax would also be levied on sports betting revenues and licensing fees, whose revenue would then be used to both regulate the online sports betting industry and help homelessness prevention programs.

 Proposition 28
 Art and Music K-12 Education Funding Initiative. This state statute initiative placed on the ballot via petition would require annual funding for arts and music education in all K-12 public schools. The annual minimum amount would be equal to 1 percent of the required state and local funding for public schools under 1988's Proposition 98. The funds would be distributed so that a greater proportion are given to schools that serve economically disadvantaged students. Schools with 500 or more students would be required to spend at 80 percent of the funding they receive to employ teachers and the other 20 percent for training and supplies.

 Proposition 29
 Dialysis Clinic Requirements Initiative. This state statute initiative placed on the ballot via petition would require kidney dialysis clinics, among others, to have at least one physician, nurse practitioner, or physician assistant, with at six months' relevant experience, on site during a patient's treatment; report daily dialysis-related infection data to the California Department of Public Health; disclose to patients all physicians with at least 5 percent ownership in the clinic; and not discriminate patients based on the source of payment.

 Proposition 30
 Tax on Income Above $2 Million for Zero-Emissions Vehicles and Wildfire Prevention Initiative. This state statute initiative placed on the ballot via petition would increase the personal income tax for those making over $2 million by 1.75 percent. The additional revenue would be used to fund zero-emission vehicle subsidies and infrastructure, and wildfire suppression and prevention programs.

 Proposition 31
 Referendum Challenging a 2020 Law Prohibiting Retail Sale Of Certain Flavored Tobacco Products. This is a referendum (placed on the ballot via petition) on Senate Bill 793 passed by the state legislature in 2020. The law would ban the sale of flavored tobacco products and tobacco product flavor enhancers. Retailers would then be fined $250 for each sale that breaks this law.

Judiciary

Supreme Court

Chief Justice
Chief Justice  Tani Cantil-Sakauye announced she would not run for retention, opting to retire at the end of her term. Governor Gavin Newsom appointed Associate Justice Patricia Guerrero as Chief Justice. Chief Justice Guerrero faced retention for a full 12-year term.

Associate Justice
Associate Justices Martin Jenkins and Goodwin Liu faced retention for full 12-year terms. Associate Justice Joshua Groban, after being appointed in 2018 by Governor Jerry Brown due to Associate Justice Kathryn Werdegar's retirement, faced retention for the remainder of Justice Werdegar's term, which expires in 2027.

See also
 2022 United States elections

Notes

References

External links
 Elections Division, The Office of the California Secretary of State.

 
California